The 1979–80 Town & Country League season was the 38th in the history of Eastern Counties Football League a football competition in England.

League table

The league featured 21 clubs which competed in the league last season, along with one new club:
Tiptree United, transferred from the Essex Senior League

League table

References

External links
 Eastern Counties Football League

1979-80
1979–80 in English football leagues